Red Hills Renewable Energy Park is a 104 MWp (80 MWAC) photovoltaic power plant located about 3 miles northwest of the town of Parowan in Iron County, Utah.  It was the largest solar facility in the state when it came online in December, 2015.   The power is being sold under a 20-year power purchase agreement to Rocky Mountain Power which serves customers in Utah, Idaho, and Wyoming.

Project details

The project takes advantage of the abundant sunshine at a cool high elevation of over 6,000 feet in the Parowan Valley. It is located on 632 acres of private land close to an existing Rocky Mountain Power substation.  The project includes a visitor's center named for the late Dennis Stowell, a state senator who represented Iron County.

The project was developed by the Norwegian firm Scatec Solar starting in 2011, and was originally estimated to cost up to $500 million.  Google and Prudential Capital eventually came online as investors in the project in late 2014 with tax equity and debt financing support; with Google and Scatec Solar to retain joint ownership of the completed facility.  Construction was anticipated to create approximately 120 to 200 jobs, of which 80% were to be local.

Construction began in December 2014, and completed in December 2015.  Swinerton Renewable Energy served as the EPC contractor.  The total investment in the completed facility has been estimated at $188 million (much less than when planning started in 2011 due to the substantial drop in PV panel prices).  The 340,784 modules are expected to produce 210 million kilowatt hours of electricity each year, enough to supply about 18,500 homes.

On December 29, 2016 it was announced that Scatec Solar had sold its ownership interest in the operating facility to the Australian Macquarie Group.   Swinerton Renewable Energy operates and maintains the facility.

Electricity production

See also 

 Solar power in Utah
 List of power stations in Utah

References

Photovoltaic power stations in the United States
Solar power stations in Utah
Buildings and structures in Iron County, Utah
Energy infrastructure completed in 2016